Moxahala Park is an unincorporated community in Muskingum County, in the U.S. state of Ohio.

Moxahala Park had its start in 1906 when an amusement park opened near the site.

References

Unincorporated communities in Muskingum County, Ohio
1906 establishments in Ohio
Unincorporated communities in Ohio